Every Man For Himself is a 1924 short silent comedy film directed by Robert F. McGowan. It was the 31st Our Gang short subject released.

Plot
The Gang is running a combination boxing club and (wireless) shoeshine business. After the boxing gloves owner takes his gloves home, the gym rent is due, and with some customer service mistakes in the shoeshine stand, the gang needs to raise money. They drum up business by spraying paint on men's shoes and cleaning them until a policeman catches them. One of the marks proves to be Jimbo Johnson, the "price" fighter, who bails the gang out.

The identical twin brothers "Scrappy" and "Sissy" then move into the neighborhood. Mickey tries to establish the social pecking order by fighting, but the boys keep switching places and confuse Mickey and the gang.

Cast

The Gang
 Joe Cobb — Joe
 Jackie Condon — Jackie
 Allen Hoskins — Farina
 Andy Samuel — Andy
 Mickey Daniels — Mickey
 Mary Kornman — Mary
 Sonny Loy — Sing Joy
 Pal the Dog — Himself

Additional cast
 Charles and Ray DeBriac — Scrappy and Sissy
 Monty O'Grady — Monty
 Gabe Saienz — Toughey
 George B. French – inebriated shoeshine customer
 Dick Gilbert – man whose shoes get sprayed
 William Gillespie — pedestrian
 Helen Gilmore — pedestrian
 Clara Guiol — bookworm
 Earl Mohan – friend of boxer
 Rolfe Sedan – man seated at shoeshine stand
 Martha Sleeper – lady with rings around eyes

References

External links

1924 films
American silent short films
American black-and-white films
1924 comedy films
Films directed by Robert F. McGowan
Hal Roach Studios short films
Our Gang films
1924 short films
1920s American films
Silent American comedy films